Corey is a masculine given name and a surname. It is a masculine version of name Cora, which has Greek origins and is the maiden name of the goddess Persephone.  The name also can have origins from the Gaelic word coire, which means "in a cauldron" or "in a hollow".

As a surname, it has a number of possible derivations, including an Old Norse personal name Kori of uncertain meaning, which is found in Scandinavia and England, often meaning curly haired. As an Irish surname it comes from Ó Comhraidhe (descendant of Comhraidheh). Notable people or fictional characters named Corey include:

First name

A
Corey Adam (born 1981), American stand-up comedian
Corey Adams (born 1962), Australian rugby player
Corey Adamson (born 1992), Australian baseball and Australian rules football player
Corey Allan (born 1998), Australian rugby player
Corey Allen (1934–2010), American film and television director
Corey Anderson (disambiguation), multiple people
Corey Arnold (born 1976), American photographer
Corey Ashe (born 1986), American soccer player

B
Corey Baird (born 1996), American soccer player
Corey Baker (baseball) (born 1989), Israeli-American baseball player
Corey Baker (choreographer), New Zealand choreographer
Corey Ballentine (born 1996), American football player
Corey Beaulieu (born 1983), American guitar player
Corey Beck (born 1971), American basketball player
Corey Bell (born 1973), Australian rules footballer
Corey Benjamin (born 1978), American basketball player
Corey Black (born 1969), American jockey
Corey Bojorquez (born 1996), American football player
Corey Bradford (born 1975), American football player
Corey Bramlet (born 1983), American football player
Corey Loog Brennan (born 1959), guitarist, songwriter, and academic
Corey Brewer (born 1986), American basketball player
Corey Brown (disambiguation), multiple people
Corey Brunish, American singer and actor
Corey Burton (born 1955), American voice actor

C
Corey Cadby (born 1995), Australian professional darts player
Corey Carrier (born 1980), American actor
Corey Cerovsek (born 1972), Canadian violinist and mathematician
Corey Chavous (born 1976), American football player
Corey Clark (born 1980), American singer
Corey Clement (born 1994), American football player
Corey Cogdell (born 1986), American trapshooter
Corey Coleman (born 1994), American football player
Corey Collymore (born 1977), West Indies cricketer
Corey Conners (born 1992), Canadian golfer
Corey Corbin (born 1969), American politician
Corey Cott (born 1990), American actor and singer
Corey Crawford (born 1984), Canadian ice hockey player
Corey Croom (born 1971), American football player
Corey Crowder (born 1969), American basketball player

D
Corey Davis (disambiguation), multiple people
Corey Deuel (born 1977), American professional pocket billiards player
Corey Dickerson (born 1989), American baseball player
Corey Dillon (born 1974), American football player
Corey Domachowski (born 1996), Welsh rugby union player
Corey Duffel (born 1984), American professional skateboarder

E
Corey Edwards (born 1983), Barbadian cricketer
Corey Elkins (born 1985), American ice hockey player
Corey Ellis (born 1996), Australian rules footballer
Corey Enright (born 1981), Australian rules footballer

F
Corey Feldman (born 1971), American actor
Corey Fischer (1945–2020), American actor
Corey Fisher (born 1988), American basketball player
Corey Flintoff (born 1946), American news correspondent
Corey Ford (1902–1969), American humorist and author
Corey Foster (born 1969), Canadian ice hockey player
Corey Fuller (born 1990), American football player

G
Corey Gaines (born 1965), American basketball player and coach
Corey Glasgow (born 1979), Barbadian cricketer
Corey Glover (born 1964), American musician, lead singer for the band Living Colour
Corey Graham (born 1985), American football player
Corey Grant (born 1991), American football player
Corey Graves (born 1984), American wrestling announcer

H
Corey Haim (1971–2010), Canadian actor
Corey Hall (American football) (born 1979), American football player
Corey Hall (rugby league) (born 2002), American rugby league footballer
Corey Harawira-Naera (born 1995), New Zealand rugby league footballer
Corey Harris (disambiguation), multiple people
Corey Harrison (born 1983), American businessman
Corey Hart (disambiguation), multiple people
Corey Harwell, American neuroscientist
Corey Hawkins (born 1988), American actor
Corey Hebert (born 1969), American journalist and physician
Corey Hertzog (born 1990), American soccer player
Corey Hill (1978–2015), American mixed martial artist
Corey Hilliard (born 1985), American football player
Corey Hirsch (born 1972), Canadian ice hockey player
Corey Holcomb (born 1968), American comedian
Corey Hughes (born 1978), Australian rugby league footballer
Corey Hulsey (born 1977), American football player

I
Corey Ivy (born 1977), American football player

J
Corey Jackson (disambiguation), multiple people
Corey James (born 1992), English disc jockey
Corey Jenkins (born 1976), American football player
Corey Jensen (born 1994), Australian rugby league footballer
Corey Johnson (disambiguation), multiple people
Corey Jones (born 1981), Australian rules footballer
Corey Jordan (born 1999), English footballer

K
Corey Kelly (born 2000), Australian cricketer
Corey Kispert (born 1999), American basketball player
Corey Kluber (born 1986), American baseball player
Corey Knebel (born 1991), American baseball player
Corey Koskie (born 1973), American baseball player

L
Corey LaJoie (born 1991), American professional stock car racer
Corey Lanerie (born 1974), American jockey
Corey William Large (born 1975), Canadian writer and actor
Corey Layton (born 1979), Australian radio broadcaster
Corey Lee (baseball) (born 1974), American baseball player
Corey Lee (chef) (born 1977), Korean-American chef
Corey Lemonier (born 1991), American football player
Corey Levin (born 1994), American football player
Corey Lewandowski (born 1973), American political lobbyist
Corey Lewis, American comic book creator
Corey Linsley (born 1991), American football player
Corey Littrell (born 1992), American baseball player
Corey Liuget (born 1990), American football player
Corey Locke (born 1984), Canadian ice hockey player
Corey Lof (born 1990), Canadian actor
Corey Louchiey (born 1971), American football player
Corey Bryant Loftus (born 1999), American musician
Corey Lowery (born 1973), American musician and songwriter
Corey Lynch (born 1985), American football player

M
Corey Mace (born 1985), Canadian football player
Corey Maclin (1970–2013), American television broadcaster
Corey Maggette (born 1979), American basketball player
Corey Makelim (born 1994), American rugby union footballer
Corey Marks (born 1989), Canadian rock and country singer
Corey Martin, American Air Force general
Corey May, American video game writer
Corey Mayfield (born 1970), American football player
Corey Mays (born 1983), American football player
Corey L. Maze (born 1978), American judge
Corey McPherrin (born 1955), American news anchor
Corey Mesler (born 1955), American writer
Corey Miller (disambiguation), multiple people
Corey Moore (born 1979), American football player
Corey Moore (safety) (born 1993), American football player
Corey Muirhead (born 1983), American basketball player

N
Corey Nakatani (born 1970), American jockey
Corey Nelson (born 1992), American football player
Corey Norman (born 1991), Australian rugby league player

O
Corey Oates (born 1994), Australian Rugby League player
Corey O'Brien (born 1973), American lawyer and politician
Corey O'Keeffe (born 1998), English footballer
Corey Oswalt (born 1993), American baseball player

P
Corey Page (born 1975), Australian film and television actor
Corey Paris, American politician
Corey Parker (disambiguation), multiple people
Corey Patterson (born 1979), American baseball player
Corey Paul (born 1987), American hip hop musician
Corey Pavin (born 1959), American professional golfer
Corey Pearson (born 1973), Australian rugby league footballer
Corey Perry (born 1985), Canadian ice hockey player
Corey Peters (born 1988), American football player
Corey Postiglione (born 1942), American artist and art critic
Corey Potter (born 1984), American ice hockey player
Corey S. Powell (born 1966), American science writer and journalist
Corey Pullig (born 1973), American football player

R
Corey Ragsdale (born 1982), American baseball coach
Corey Raji (born 1988), American-Nigerian basketball player
Corey Ray (born 1994), American baseball player
Corey Raymond (born 1969), American football coach
Corey Reynolds (born 1974), American musical and film actor
Corey Robin (born 1967), American political theorist and journalist
Corey Robinson (disambiguation), multiple people
Corey Rodriguez (born 1979), American boxer

S
Corey Sanders (disambiguation), multiple people
Corey Sawyer (born 1971), American football player
Corey Schwab (born 1970), Canadian ice hockey player
Corey Scott (1968–1997), American stunt artist and motorcycle rider
Corey Seager (born 1994), American baseball player
Corey Sigler (born to be wild), Dodge Charger owner
Corey Sevier (born 1984), Canadian actor
Corey Simon (born 1977), American football player
Corey Small (born 1987), Canadian lacrosse player
Corey Smith (disambiguation), multiple people
Corey Stapleton (born 1967), American politician
Corey Stevens (born 1954), American blues guitarist
Corey Stewart (born 1968), American politician
Corey Stoll (born 1976), American actor
Corey Surrency (born 1984), American football player
Corey Swinson (1969–2013), American football player

T
Corey Taylor (born 1973), American lead singer of the heavy metal bands Slipknot and Stone Sour
Corey Thomas (American football) (born 1975), American football player
Corey Thompson (born 1990), Australian rugby union footballer
Corey Thompson (American football) (born 1993), American football player
Corey Tochor (born 1977), Canadian politician
Corey Tutt (born 1992), Australian STEM champion

V
Corey Vereen (born 1995), American football player
Corey Vidal (born 1986), Canadian YouTuber

W
Corey Waddell (born 1996), Australian rugby league footballer
Corey Walden (born 1992), American professional basketball player
Corey D. B. Walker, American political thinker
Corey Ward, American rapper
Corey Warren (born 2000), Australian footballer
Corey Washington (born 1991), American football player
Corey Webster (born 1982), American football player
Corey Webster (basketball) (born 1988), New Zealand basketball player
Corey Wedlock (born 1996), Australian lawn and indoor bowler
Corey Whelan (born 1997), English-Irish soccer player
Corey White (born 1990), American football player
Corey White (comedian), Australian comedian
Corey Widmer (born 1968), American football player
Corey Williams (disambiguation), multiple people
Corey Woods (disambiguation), multiple people
Corey Wootton (born 1987), American football player

Y
Corey Yuen (born 1951), Hong Kong film director

Surname 
Albert Corey (1878–1926), French athlete
Angela Corey (born 1954), American attorney
Bryan Corey (born 1973), American baseball pitcher
Cathal Corey, Gaelic football manager and former player
Ed Corey (1894–1970), American baseball pitcher
Elias James Corey (born 1928), American organic chemist and Nobel Prize laureate
Giles Corey (1611–1692) and Martha Corey (1620–1692), husband and wife executed in the Salem witch trials
Irving Corey (1892–1976), Canadian flying ace in World War I
 "Professor" Irwin Corey (1914–2017), American comedian and actor
Isabelle Corey (1939–2011), French film actress
James S. A. Corey, pen name used by collaborating American novelists Daniel Abraham and Ty Franck
Jeff Corey (1914–2002), American stage and screen actor and director 
Jill Corey (1935–2021), American singer
Jim Corey (1883–1956), American actor
Robert Corey (1897–1971), American structural chemist
Ronald Corey (born 1938), Canadian businessman and former professional ice hockey executive
Walt Corey (1938–2022), American football player and coach
Wendell Corey (1914–1968), American actor and politician

Fictional characters
Corey Riffin, a character from Canadian animated TV series Grojband

See also

Corey correlation, in relative permeability

Corie, given name
Corrie (given name)
Corrie (surname)
Corry (surname)
Cory, given name and surname
Korey, given name and surname
Kory (given name)

Footnotes

English masculine given names
Masculine given names
Scottish masculine given names